Hand fetishism or hand partialism or also cheirophilia is the sexual fetish for hands. This may include the sexual attraction to a specific area such as the fingers, palm, back of the hand and/or nails, or the attraction to a specific action performed by the hands; which may otherwise be considered non-sexual—such as washing and drying dishes, painting of the fingernails and nail-biting. This fetish may manifest itself as a desire to experience physical interaction, or as a source of sexual fantasy.

Hand fetishism is recognized by the porn industry; however, aside from handjobs, it is one of the least common fetishes, despite foot fetishism being the most common.

Characteristics
The attraction associated with hand fetishism can be expressed in a variety of ways, including fingering, handjobs, sucking on the fingers, and licking the palms. These activities may be performed on oneself or on a partner, and they can involve a range of sensations and movements that are designed to create sexual arousal and pleasure. One of the most common expressions of hand fetishism is the act of fingering. This can involve inserting one or more fingers into the vagina or anus, and the sensation of the fingers moving in and out can be incredibly pleasurable for both partners. Similarly, handjobs involve using the hands to stimulate the penis, and the movements and pressure can be adjusted to create different levels of stimulation and pleasure. Sucking on the fingers and licking the palms are also popular expressions of hand fetishism. The sensation of the wet, warm mouth on the fingers can be an incredibly erotic experience, and the act of sucking or licking can be seen as a form of foreplay or intimacy between partners.

Fingernail fetishism 
Fingernail fetishism is a specific type of fetishism that falls under the umbrella of hand fetishism. This particular fetish is characterized by an intense attraction or fixation on the fingernails of a person. Individuals who have this fetish may experience sexual arousal or pleasure from activities that involve the fingernails, such as scratching or caressing with the nails, painting the nails in various colors, and even the length of the nails.

One of the most common expressions of fingernail fetishism is the act of scratching with the nails. This can involve either the person with the fetish scratching someone else or being scratched themselves. The sensation of the nails on the skin can be an incredibly arousing experience for those with this fetish, and the act of scratching can even be seen as a form of foreplay.

Another aspect of fingernail fetishism is the attraction to painted nails. The colors and designs used on the nails can be seen as a form of artistic expression, and some individuals may find the creativity and attention to detail that goes into painting the nails incredibly attractive. In some cases, the act of painting the nails may even be a shared activity between partners with a fingernail fetish.

Finally, fingernail length is also a significant aspect of this fetish. Some individuals with a fingernail fetish find longer nails to be particularly appealing, as they can be used to scratch and caress more effectively. However, it is worth noting that long nails can also be impractical in certain situations and may require extra care to maintain.

Short Fingernail fetishism 
While fingernail fetishism is often associated with long, elegant nails, some individuals may find themselves attracted to the opposite - short nails. This unique fetish is characterized by an intense attraction or fixation on the short, rounded nails of a person.

For individuals with a short nail fetish, the appearance and feel of short nails can be incredibly appealing. The rounded shape of the nails may be seen as cute or charming, and the lack of length can create a sense of practicality and functionality. The act of biting or chewing on the nails may also be seen as an attractive behavior.

In some cases, the attraction to short nails may also be linked to a preference for more masculine or androgynous appearances. Short nails are often associated with a more practical and functional approach to personal grooming, which may be seen as a desirable trait in certain individuals.

It is worth noting that the act of biting or chewing on the nails can have negative health consequences, including the spread of germs and the potential for infection. As such, it is important to maintain good hygiene practices and to seek help if the behavior becomes compulsive or damaging.

Frequency
In 2007, a study was conducted by the University of Bologna on around 5000 fetishist participants to see the prevalence of fetishes. The study analyzed the content inside online fetish communities and found only 669 participants (less than 1%) referring to nails, an extension of hand fetishism.  This did not refer to fingernails specifically.

In popular culture 
In Hirohiko Araki's popular manga series, JoJo's Bizarre Adventure Part 4: Diamond Is Unbreakable, the main villain, a serial killer named Yoshikage Kira, has a notable hand fetish which drives most of his homicidal actions. He often goes for the hands of females he deems as “pieces of trash” and murders the woman while severing one of their hands easily with his ability. He keeps the hands of his victims as his 'girlfriends', which he treats like an actual person until they start decomposing, where he will then search for a new victim. His hand fetish had been stated to have begun early in his teens after he witnessed the portrait of the Mona Lisa, saw her hands, and “got an erection”.

Dr. Hannibal Lecter from the novel "The Silence of the Lambs" and its film adaptation. Dr. Lecter is known for his obsession with hands, particularly those of his victims, which he uses to create a macabre piece of art.

In music, hand fetishism has been explored in songs such as Madonna's "Erotica," in which she sings about the erotic appeal of a lover's hands, and Prince's "Cream," which contains the lyrics "Cream, get on top / Cream, you will cop / Cream, don't you stop / Cream, sh-boogie bop." These songs demonstrate the ways in which hand fetishism can be incorporated into popular music to create a sensual and erotic atmosphere.

Hand fetishism has also been portrayed in various television shows, including "American Horror Story," where the character of Elsa Mars has a hand fetish and is shown to be sexually aroused by the appearance and touch of hands. In addition, the character of Jim Halpert in "The Office" is known for his frequent hand gestures and has been the subject of hand fetish fan fiction.

In the world of art, hand fetishism has been explored by numerous artists, including Salvador Dali, who created a painting titled "The Persistence of Memory," which features a distorted hand with ants crawling over it. Similarly, the photographer Man Ray created a series of images featuring disembodied hands, which were intended to evoke erotic and surreal feelings in the viewer.

See also
 Foot fetishism
 Fingering
 Fisting
 Handjob
 Kira Yoshikage

References

Paraphilias
Sexual fetishism